This is a list of episodes of the Nickelodeon animated television series Fanboy & Chum Chum.

Series overview

Episodes

Pilot (2009)

Season 1 (2009–10)
The first season comprises 26 half-hour episodes with two short-length segments in per episode. This is the only season that didn't have half-hour specials.

Season 2 (2011–14)
On March 12, 2010, the series was picked up for a second season of 26 episodes.  The writers of the series said they started writing season two on February 1, 2010.  The season first aired on April 25, 2011 with the episode segments "I'm Man-Arctica" and "No Toy Story." Nickelodeon aired episodes from this season sporadically until December 10, 2011. The episode segments "Robo-mance" and "Rattleskunkupine!" aired on February 11, 2012 after a 2-month hiatus. Many months later, between October 15, 2012 and November 2, 2012, Nickelodeon aired a total of 29 new Fanboy and Chum Chum episode segments from Season 2. No third season was announced at Nickelodeon's upfront for the 2013-2014 season. One episode segment, "Brain Freeze," was not broadcast until July 12, 2014, but was released to DVD on August 16, 2011.

Home media

References

Fanboy and Chum Chum
Fanboy and Chum Chum